Graphicoptila is a genus of moths belonging to the family Tineidae.

There is presently only one species in this genus: Graphicoptila dissociata (Meyrick, 1922) that is known from India.

References

Tineidae
Tineidae genera
Taxa named by Edward Meyrick
Monotypic moth genera